Drenovac may refer to:

Places
 Drenovac, Knjaževac, a village in Knjaževac, Zaječar, Serbia
 Drenovac, Paraćin, a village in Paraćin, Pomoravlje District, Serbia
 Drenovac, Prokuplje, a village in Prokuplje, Toplica, Serbia
 Drenovac, Šabac, a town in Šabac, Mačva District, Serbia
 Drenovac, Stanovo, a village in Stanovo, Šumadija District, Serbia
 Drenovac, Vranje, a village in Vranje, Pčinja, Serbia

People
 Božidar Drenovac (1922–2003), Serbian football player and manager
 Đorđe Drenovac (born 1992), Serbian basketball player